The Universities Research Association is a non-profit association of more than 90 research universities, primarily but not exclusively in the United States. It has members also in Japan, Italy, and in the United Kingdom. It was founded in 1965 at the behest of the President's Science Advisory Committee and the National Academy of Sciences to build and operate Fermilab, a National Accelerator Laboratory. Today, the mission of URA is "to establish and operate in the national interest unique laboratories and facilities for research, development, and education in the physical and biological sciences to expand the frontiers of knowledge, foster innovation, and promote the education of future generations of scientists."

History
In 1962, the President's Science Advisory Committee and a sister committee under the United States Atomic Energy Commission joined to "assess the future needs in high-energy accelerator physics." The recommendations from this panel, set out in 1963, included the need to immediately begin construction and design on a series of cutting-edge, high-energy proton accelerators to ensure that the U.S. stayed at the forefront of this emerging set of technologies and the science they enabled. An additional recommendation called for a new administrative construct to ensure robust participation of experts from a broad swath of the Nation’s universities. In early 1965 the National Academy of Sciences addressed this last recommendation by sponsoring a meeting of presidents from twenty-five major research universities to discuss the management of the accelerator facility that would later become the Fermi National Accelerator Laboratory (Fermilab). The meeting eventually resulted in the decision to form the Universities Research Association, with 34 original members, to build and manage the new accelerator facility. URA filed its articles of incorporation on June 21, 1965. J. C. Warner, president of the Carnegie Institute of Technology, served as URA’s first president. 

URA has been involved in complex scientific endeavors, including the development of the Tevatron at Fermilab, early activities related to the Super-Conducting Supercollider, Pierre Auger Cosmic Observatory, the Long-Baseline Neutrino Facility (LBNF), and the associated Deep Underground Neutrino Experiment (DUNE), and involvement in the Honeywell International-led National Technology and Engineering Solutions at Sandia (NTESS) that manages and operates Sandia National Laboratories. Current major projects of the association include supporting Fermilab through a partnership with the University of Chicago and coordinating U.S. support of the Pierre Auger Cosmic Observatory.

Members

United States

Alabama
University of Alabama

Arizona
Arizona State University
University of Arizona

California
California Institute of Technology
University of California, Berkeley
University of California, Davis
University of California, Irvine
University of California, Los Angeles
University of California, Riverside
University of California, San Diego
University of California, Santa Barbara
Stanford University

Colorado
Colorado State University
University of Colorado Boulder

Connecticut
Yale University

Florida
Florida State University
University of Florida

Georgia
Georgia Institute of Technology

Illinois
University of Chicago
Illinois Institute of Technology
University of Illinois at Chicago
University of Illinois at Urbana-Champaign
Northern Illinois University
Northwestern University

Indiana
Indiana University
University of Notre Dame
Purdue University

Iowa
Iowa State University
University of Iowa

Kansas
Kansas State University

Kentucky
University of Kentucky

Louisiana
Louisiana State University
Tulane University

Maryland
Johns Hopkins University
University of Maryland, College Park

Massachusetts
Boston University
Harvard University
Massachusetts Institute of Technology
Northeastern University
Tufts University

Michigan
Michigan State University
University of Michigan
Wayne State University

Minnesota
University of Minnesota, Twin Cities

Mississippi
University of Mississippi

Missouri
Washington University in St. Louis

Nebraska
University of Nebraska-Lincoln

New Jersey
Princeton University
Rutgers University

New Mexico
New Mexico State University
University of New Mexico

New York
University at Buffalo
Columbia University
Cornell University
University of Rochester
Rockefeller University
Stony Brook University
Syracuse University

North Carolina
Duke University
University of North Carolina at Chapel Hill

Ohio
Case Western Reserve University
Ohio State University

Oklahoma
University of Oklahoma

Oregon
University of Oregon

Pennsylvania
Carnegie Mellon University
Pennsylvania State University
University of Pennsylvania
University of Pittsburgh

Rhode Island
Brown University

South Carolina
University of South Carolina

Tennessee
University of Tennessee
Vanderbilt University

Texas
University of Houston
University of North Texas
Rice University
Southern Methodist University
Texas A&M University
Texas Tech University
University of Texas at Arlington
University of Texas at Austin
University of Texas at Dallas

Virginia
Virginia Polytechnic Institute and State University
University of Virginia
College of William & Mary

Washington
University of Washington

Wisconsin
University of Wisconsin-Madison

Italy
University of Pisa

Japan
Waseda University

United Kingdom
University College London
University of Liverpool
University of Manchester

References

External links
Official website

College and university associations and consortia in North America
International college and university associations and consortia
Organizations established in 1965
Organizations based in Washington, D.C.